

Events

Pre-1600
1111 – Highest Galician nobility led by Pedro Fróilaz de Traba and the bishop Diego Gelmírez crown Alfonso VII as "King of Galicia".
1176 – The Battle of Myriokephalon is the last attempt by the Byzantine Empire to recover central Anatolia from the Seljuk Turks.
1382 – Louis the Great's daughter, Mary, is crowned "king" of Hungary.
1462 – Thirteen Years' War: A Polish army under Piotr Dunin decisively defeats the Teutonic Order at the Battle of Świecino.
1543 – The first Finnish-language book, the Abckiria by Mikael Agricola, is published in Stockholm.
1577 – The Treaty of Bergerac is signed between King Henry III of France and the Huguenots.

1601–1900
1620 – Polish–Ottoman War: The Ottoman Empire defeats the Polish–Lithuanian Commonwealth during the Battle of Cecora.
1631 – Sweden wins a major victory at the Battle of Breitenfeld against the Holy Roman Empire during the Thirty Years' War. 
1658 – The Battle of Vilanova is fought between Portugal and Spain during the Portuguese Restoration War.
1683 – Antonie van Leeuwenhoek writes a letter to the Royal Society describing "animalcules", later known as protozoa.
1775 – American Revolutionary War: The invasion of Canada begins with the Siege of Fort St. Jean.
1776 – The Presidio of San Francisco is founded in New Spain.
1778 – The Treaty of Fort Pitt is signed. It is the first formal treaty between the United States and a Native American tribe.
1787 – The United States Constitution is signed in Philadelphia.
1793 – War of the Pyrenees: France defeats a Spanish force at the Battle of Peyrestortes.
1794 – Flanders Campaign: France completes its conquest of the Austrian Netherlands at the Battle of Sprimont.
1809 – Peace between Sweden and Russia in the Finnish War; the territory that will become Finland is ceded to Russia by the Treaty of Fredrikshamn.
1849 – American abolitionist Harriet Tubman escapes from slavery.
1859 – Joshua A. Norton declares himself "Norton I, Emperor of the United States."
1861 – Argentine Civil Wars: The State of Buenos Aires defeats the Argentine Confederation at the Battle of Pavón.
1862 – American Civil War: George B. McClellan halts the northward drive of Robert E. Lee's Confederate Army in the single-day Battle of Antietam, the bloodiest day in American military history.
  1862   – American Civil War: The Allegheny Arsenal explosion results in the single largest civilian disaster during the war.
1894 – Battle of the Yalu River, the largest naval engagement of the First Sino-Japanese War. 
1900 – Philippine–American War: Filipinos under Juan Cailles defeat Americans under Colonel Benjamin F. Cheatham Jr. at Mabitac.

1901–present
1901 – Second Boer War: A Boer column defeats a British force at the Battle of Blood River Poort.
  1901   – Second Boer War: Boers capture a squadron of the 17th Lancers at the Battle of Elands River.
1908 – The Wright Flyer flown by Orville Wright, with Lieutenant Thomas Selfridge as passenger, crashes, killing Selfridge, who becomes the first airplane fatality.
1914 – Andrew Fisher becomes Prime Minister of Australia for the third time.
  1914   – World War I: The Race to the Sea begins.
1916 – World War I: Manfred von Richthofen ("The Red Baron"), a flying ace of the German Luftstreitkräfte, wins his first aerial combat near Cambrai, France.
1920 – The National Football League is organized as the American Professional Football Association in Canton, Ohio.
1924 – The Border Protection Corps is established in the Second Polish Republic for the defence of the eastern border against armed Soviet raids and local bandits. 
1928 – The Okeechobee hurricane strikes southeastern Florida, killing more than 2,500 people.
1930 – The Kurdish Ararat rebellion is suppressed by the Turks.
1932 – A speech by Laureano Gómez leads to the escalation of the Leticia Incident.
1935 – The Niagara Gorge Railroad ceases operations after a rockslide.
1939 – World War II: The Soviet invasion of Poland begins.
  1939   – World War II:  sinks the British aircraft carrier .
1940 – World War II: Due to setbacks in the Battle of Britain and approaching autumn weather, Hitler postpones Operation Sea Lion.
1941 – World War II: A decree of the Soviet State Committee of Defense restores compulsory military training.
  1941   – World War II: Soviet forces enter Tehran during the Anglo-Soviet invasion of Iran.
1944 – World War II: Allied airborne troops parachute into the Netherlands as the "Market" half of Operation Market Garden.
  1944   – World War II: Soviet troops launch the Tallinn Offensive against Germany and pro-independence Estonian units.
  1944   – World War II: German forces are attacked by the Allies in the Battle of San Marino.
1948 – The Lehi (also known as the Stern gang) assassinates Count Folke Bernadotte, who was appointed by the United Nations to mediate between the Arab nations and Israel.
  1948   – The Nizam of Hyderabad surrenders his sovereignty over the Hyderabad State and joins the Indian Union.
1949 – The Canadian steamship  burns in Toronto Harbour with the loss of over 118 lives.
1961 – The world's first retractable roof stadium, the Civic Arena, opens in Pittsburgh, Pennsylvania.
  1961   – Northwest Orient Airlines Flight 706 crashes during takeoff from O'Hare International Airport in Chicago, Illinois, killing all 37 people on board.
1965 – The Battle of Chawinda is fought between Pakistan and India.
1974 – Bangladesh, Grenada and Guinea-Bissau join the United Nations.
1976 – The Space Shuttle Enterprise is unveiled by NASA. 
1978 – The Camp David Accords are signed by Israel and Egypt.
1980 – After weeks of strikes at the Lenin Shipyard in Gdańsk, Poland, the nationwide independent trade union Solidarity is established. 
  1980   – Former Nicaraguan President Anastasio Somoza Debayle is killed in Asunción, Paraguay.
1983 – Vanessa Williams becomes the first black Miss America.
1991 – Estonia, North Korea, South Korea, Latvia, Lithuania, the Marshall Islands and Micronesia join the United Nations.
  1991   – The first version of the Linux kernel (0.01) is released to the Internet.
1992 – An Iranian Kurdish leader and his two joiners are assassinated by political militants in Berlin.
2001 – The New York Stock Exchange reopens for trading after the September 11 attacks, the longest closure since the Great Depression.
2006 – Fourpeaked Mountain in Alaska erupts, marking the first eruption for the volcano in at least 10,000 years. 
  2006   – An audio tape of a private speech by Hungarian Prime Minister Ferenc Gyurcsány is leaked to the public, in which he confessed that his Hungarian Socialist Party had lied to win the 2006 election, sparking widespread protests across the country.
2011 – Occupy Wall Street movement begins in Zuccotti Park, New York City.
2013 – Grand Theft Auto V earns more than half a billion dollars on its first day of release.
2016 – Two bombs explode in Seaside Park, New Jersey, and Manhattan. Thirty-one people are injured in the Manhattan bombing.
2018 – A Russian reconnaissance aircraft carrying 15 people on board is brought down by a Syrian surface-to-air missile over the Mediterranean Sea.

Births

Pre-1600
 879 – Charles the Simple, Frankish king (d. 929)
1433 – James of Portugal, Portuguese prince and cardinal (d. 1459)
1479 – Celio Calcagnini, Italian astronomer (d. 1541)
1550 – Paul V, pope of the Catholic Church (d. 1621)
1565 – Edward Fortunatus, German nobleman (d. 1600)
1578 – John Prideaux, English administrator and bishop (d. 1650)

1601–1900
1605 – Francesco Sacrati, Italian composer (d. 1650)
1630 – Ranuccio II Farnese, duke of Parma (d. 1694)
1639 – Hans Herr, Swiss bishop (d. 1725)
1688 – Maria Luisa of Savoy, queen consort of Spain (d. 1714)
1730 – Friedrich Wilhelm von Steuben, Prussian-American general (d. 1794)
1739 – John Rutledge, American judge and politician, 2nd Chief Justice of the United States (d. 1800)
1743 – Marquis de Condorcet, French mathematician and political scientist (d. 1794)
1771 – Johann August Apel, German jurist and author (d. 1816)
1773 – Jonathan Alder, American captain and farmer (d. 1849)
1783 – Nadezhda Durova, Russian soldier (d. 1866)
1797 – Heinrich Kuhl, German naturalist and zoologist (d. 1821)
1817 – Herman Adolfovich Trautscohold, German geologist and paleontologist (d. 1902)
1819 – Marthinus Wessel Pretorius, South African general and politician, 1st President of the South African Republic (d. 1901)
1820 – Émile Augier, French playwright (d. 1889)
  1820   – Earl Van Dorn, Confederate general (d. 1863)
1821 – Arthur Saint-Léon, French choreographer (d. 1870)
1825 – Lucius Quintus Cincinnatus Lamar II, American jurist and politician, 16th United States Secretary of the Interior (d. 1893)
1826 – Bernhard Riemann, German-Italian mathematician and academic (d. 1866)
1850 – Guerra Junqueiro, Portuguese journalist, lawyer, and politician (d. 1923)
1853 – Frederick Corbett, British officer and Victoria Cross recipient (d. 1912)
1854 – David Dunbar Buick, Scottish-American businessman, founded Buick Motor Company (d. 1929)
1857 – Konstantin Tsiolkovsky, Russian scientist and engineer (d. 1935)
1859 – Frank Dawson Adams, Canadian geologist and academic (d. 1942)
  1859   – Billy the Kid, American gunman (d. 1881)
  1859   – I. L. Patterson, American politician, 18th Governor of Oregon (d. 1929)
1860 – Mihkel Martna, Estonian journalist and politician (d. 1934)
1864 – Mykhailo Kotsiubynsky, Ukrainian writer (d. 1913)
  1864   – James Tancred, English admiral (d. 1943)
1865 – William Murray McPherson, Australian politician, 31st Premier of Victoria (d. 1932)
1867 – Vera Yevstafievna Popova, Russian chemist (d. 1896)
1868 – James Alexander Calder, Canadian educator and politician, Canadian Minister of Militia and Defence (d. 1956)
1869 – Christian Lous Lange, Norwegian political scientist, historian, and academic, Nobel Prize laureate (d. 1938)
1874 – Walter Murdoch, Australian author and academic (d. 1970)
1878 – Vincenzo Tommasini, Italian composer (d. 1950)
1879 – Rube Foster, American baseball player and manager (d. 1930)
  1879   – Periyar E. V. Ramasamy, Indian businessman, social activist,  and politician (d. 1973)
1881 – Alfred Carpenter, English admiral, Victoria Cross recipient (d. 1955)
1883 – William Carlos Williams, American poet, short story writer, and essayist (d. 1963)
1884 – Charles Griffes, American pianist and composer (d. 1920)
1886 – Anton Irv, Estonian captain (d. 1919)
1897 – Earl Webb, American baseball player and coach (d. 1965)
1900 – Hughie Critz, American baseball player (d. 1980)
  1900   – Lena Frances Edwards, African-American physician, awarded the Presidential Medal of Freedom (d. 1986)
  1900   – J. Willard Marriott, American businessman, founded the Marriott Corporation (d. 1985)
  1900   – Martha Ostenso, Canadian screenwriter and novelist (d. 1963)
  1900   – Hedwig Ross, New Zealand-born educator and political activist, founding member of the Communist Party of New Zealand (d. 1971)

1901–present
1901 – Francis Chichester, English pilot and sailor (d. 1972)
1902 – Bea Miles, Australian author (d. 1973)
1903 – Karel Miljon, Dutch boxer (d. 1984)
  1903   – Frank O'Connor, Irish short story writer, novelist, and poet (d. 1966)
  1903   – Minanogawa Tōzō, Japanese sumo wrestler, the 34th Yokozuna (d. 1971)
1905 – Tshekedi Khama, regent of the Bamangwato tribe (d. 1959)
1906 – J. R. Jayewardene, Sri Lankan lawyer and politician, 2nd President of Sri Lanka (d. 1996)
  1906   – Edgar Wayburn, American physician and environmentalist (d. 2010)
1907 – Warren E. Burger, American lawyer and judge, 15th Chief Justice of the United States (d. 1995)
1908 – John Creasey, English author and politician (d. 1973)
  1908   – Rafael Israelyan, Armenian architect and educator, designed the Sardarapat Memorial and St. Vartan Cathedral (d. 1973)
1909 – Elizabeth Enright, American author and illustrator (d. 1968)
1912 – Irena Kwiatkowska, Polish actress (d. 2011)
  1912   – Maksim Tank, Belarusian poet, journalist, and translator (d. 1995)
1914 – Thomas J. Bata, Czech-Canadian businessman (d. 2008)
  1914   – William Grut, Swedish pentathlete (d. 2012)
  1914   – Shin Kanemaru, Japanese politician, Deputy Prime Minister of Japan (d. 1996)
1915 – M. F. Husain, Indian painter and director (d. 2011)
1916 – Mary Stewart, British author and poet (d. 2014)
1917 – Ib Melchior, Danish-American author and screenwriter (d. 2015)
  1917   – Isang Yun, South Korean-German composer and educator (d. 1995)
1918 – Lea Gottlieb, Hungarian-Israeli fashion designer, founded the Gottex Company (d. 2012) 
  1918   – Chaim Herzog, Irish-born Israeli general and politician, 6th President of Israel (d. 1997)
1920 – Dinah Sheridan, English actress (d. 2012)
1922 – Agostinho Neto, Angolan poet and politician, 1st President of Angola (d. 1979)
1923 – Ralph Sharon, English-American pianist, composer, and conductor (d. 2015)
  1923   – Hank Williams, American singer-songwriter and guitarist (d. 1953)
1925 – Dorothy Loudon, American actress and singer (d. 2003)
  1925   – John List, American murderer (d. 2008)
1926 – Bill Black, American bass player and bandleader  (d. 1965)
  1926   – Curtis Harrington, American actor, director, and screenwriter (d. 2007)
  1926   – Hovie Lister, American minister and pianist (d. 2001)
  1926   – Jean-Marie Lustiger, French cardinal (d. 2007)
  1926   – Jack McDuff, American singer and organist (d. 2001)
1927 – George Blanda, American football player (d. 2010)
1928 – Park Honan, American author and academic (d. 2014)
  1928   – Roddy McDowall, English-American actor (d. 1998)
1929 – Sil Austin, American saxophonist (d. 2001)
  1929   – David Craig, Baron Craig of Radley, Northern Irish air marshal and politician
  1929   – Sir Stirling Moss, English racing driver and sportscaster (d. 2020)
1930 – David Huddleston, American actor (d. 2016)
  1930   – Lalgudi Jayaraman, Indian violinist and composer (d. 2013)
  1930   – Theo Loevendie, Dutch clarinet player and composer
  1930   – Edgar Mitchell, American captain, pilot, and astronaut (d. 2016)
  1930   – Jim Rohn, American philosopher and author (d. 2009)
  1930   – Thomas P. Stafford, American general, pilot, and astronaut
1931 – Anne Bancroft, American actress (d. 2005)
  1931   – Jean-Claude Carrière, French actor and screenwriter (d. 2021) 
1932 – Robert B. Parker, American author and academic (d. 2010)
  1932   – Indarjit Singh, Indian-English journalist
  1932   – Samuel Ogbemudia, Nigerian army officer and politician (d. 2017)
1933 – Bulldog Brower, American wrestler (d. 1997)
  1933   – Chuck Grassley, American lawyer and politician
  1933   – Claude Provost, Canadian-American ice hockey player (d. 1984)
1934 – Maureen Connolly, American tennis player (d. 1969)
1935 – Ken Kesey, American novelist, essayist, and poet (d. 2001)
1936 – Gerald Guralnik, American physicist and academic (d. 2014)
  1936   – Michael Hennagin, American composer and educator (d. 1993)
1937 – Nigel Boocock, English-Australian motorcycle racer (d. 2015)
  1937   – Orlando Cepeda, Puerto Rican-American baseball player
  1937   – Sitakant Mahapatra, Indian poet and literary critic
1938 – Paul Benedict, American actor (d. 2008)
  1938   – Perry Robinson, American clarinet player and composer (d. 2018)
  1938   – Bobby Wine, American baseball player and coach 
1939 – Carl Dennis, American poet and educator
  1939   – Shelby Flint, American singer-songwriter and voice actress
  1939   – David Souter, American lawyer and jurist 
1940 – Jan Eliasson, Swedish politician and diplomat, 4th Deputy Secretary-General of the United Nations
  1940   – Peter Lever, English cricketer
  1940   – Gilberto Parlotti, Italian motorcycle racer (d. 1972)
1941 – Bob Matsui, American lawyer and politician (d. 2005)
1942 – Robert Graysmith, American author and illustrator
  1942   – Des Lynam, Irish-English journalist and author
  1942   – Lupe Ontiveros, American actress (d. 2012)
1944 – Les Emmerson, Canadian singer-songwriter and guitarist 
  1944   – Reinhold Messner, Italian mountaineer and explorer
  1944   – Jean Taylor, American mathematician and academic
1945 – David Emerson, Canadian economist and politician, 8th Minister of Foreign Affairs for Canada
  1945   – Phil Jackson, American basketball player and coach
  1945   – Bhakti Charu Swami, Indian religious leader (d. 2020)
1946 – Billy Bonds, English footballer and manager
  1946   – Heimar Lenk, Estonian journalist and politician
1947 – Tessa Jowell, English social worker and politician, Minister for the Cabinet Office (d. 2018)
  1947   – Enrique Krauze, Mexican historian, critic, and publisher 
  1947   – Gail Carson Levine, American author
  1947   – Jeff MacNelly, American cartoonist (d. 2000)
1948 – Kemal Monteno, Bosnian singer-songwriter (d. 2015)
  1948   – John Ritter, American actor and producer (d. 2003)
1949 – Ron Stevens, Canadian lawyer and politician (d. 2014)
1950 – Narendra Modi, Indian politician; Chief Minister of Gujarat (2001–14) and 14th Prime Minister of India (2014–)
  1950   – Fee Waybill, American singer-songwriter and producer 
1951 – Russell Brown, Scottish politician
  1951   – Cassandra Peterson, American actress, television host, and producer
1952 – Harold Solomon, American tennis player and coach
1953 – Luís Amado, Portuguese politician, former Minister of Foreign Affairs
  1953   – Tamasin Day-Lewis, English chef and author
  1953   – Altaf Hussain, Pakistani-English soldier and politician
  1953   – Rita Rudner, American actress, comedian, and screenwriter
1954 – Joël-François Durand, French pianist and composer
  1954   – Bill Irwin, American wrestler
1955 – Scott Simpson, American golfer
  1955   – Charles Martinet,  American actor
  1955   – Mike Parson, American politician, 57th Governor of Missouri
1956 – Almazbek Atambayev, Kyrgyz politician, 4th President of Kyrgyzstan
  1956   – Thad Bosley, American baseball player and coach
  1956   – Mandawuy Yunupingu, Australian singer-songwriter and guitarist (d. 2013)
1957 – David Bintley, English ballet dancer and director
  1957   – Steve Bryles, American businessman and politician (d. 2012)
1958 – Janez Janša, Slovenian politician, 5th Prime Minister of Slovenia
  1958   – Tom Waddell, Scottish-American baseball player (d. 2019)
1960 – John Bottomley, Canadian singer-songwriter (d. 2011)
  1960   – John Franco, American baseball player
  1960   – Damon Hill, English racing driver and guitarist
  1960   – Alan Krueger, American economist and academic (d. 2019)
1961 – Jim Cornette, American wrestling manager and sportscaster
  1961   – Giorgos Koumoutsakos, Greek politician
  1961   – Ty Tabor, American rock singer-songwriter and guitarist
1962 – Baz Luhrmann, Australian director, producer, and screenwriter
  1962   – Dustin Nguyen, Vietnamese-American actor, director, producer, and screenwriter
  1962   – Hesham Qandil, Egyptian engineer and politician, 51st Prime Minister of Egypt
  1962   – Wayne Riley, Australian golfer
  1962   – BeBe Winans, American singer-songwriter and producer 
1963 – Masahiro Chono, American-Japanese wrestler and manager
  1963   – James Urbaniak, American actor, producer, and screenwriter
1965 – Kyle Chandler, American actor 
  1965   – Yuji Naka, Japanese video game designer, created Sonic the Hedgehog
  1965   – Guy Picciotto, American singer-songwriter, guitarist, and producer 
  1965   – Bryan Singer, American director, producer, and screenwriter 
1966 – Doug E. Fresh, American rapper and producer 
1967 – Michael Carbajal, American boxer
1968 – Cheryl Strayed, American author
  1968   – Tito Vilanova, Spanish footballer and manager (d. 2014)
1969 – Adam Devlin, English guitarist and songwriter 
  1969   – Ken Doherty, Irish snooker player
  1969   – Keith Flint, English singer-songwriter (d. 2019)
  1969   – Paul Varelans, American MMA fighter and wrestler
1971 – Nate Berkus, American interior designer and television host
  1971   – Mike Catt, South African-English rugby player and coach
  1971   – Andy Edwards, English footballer
  1971   – Mauro Milanese, Italian footballer and manager
1973 – Diego Albanese, Argentine rugby player
  1973   – Demis Nikolaidis, Greek footballer
1974 – Tormod Granheim, Norwegian skier and explorer 
  1974   – Craig Spence, Australian golfer
  1974   – Rasheed Wallace, American basketball player and coach
1975 – Wilko de Vogt, Dutch footballer
  1975   – Jimmie Johnson, American race car driver
  1975   – Pumpkinhead, American rapper (d. 2015)
1977 – Sam Esmail, American screenwriter
  1977   – Simone Perrotta, Italian footballer
1978 – Nick Cordero, Canadian actor and singer (d. 2020)
1979 – Steffen Algreen, Danish footballer
  1979   – Akin Ayodele, American football player
  1979   – Flo Rida, American rapper
1980 – Dan Haren, American baseball player
  1980   – Shabana Mahmood, English lawyer and politician, Shadow Chief Secretary to the Treasury
  1980   – Oliver Risser, Namibian footballer
1981 – Casey Janssen, American baseball player
  1981   – Bakari Koné, Ivorian footballer
  1981   – Francis Manioru, Solomon sprinter
1982 – Garth Murray, Canadian ice hockey player
1983 – Ice Seguerra, Filipino singer, actor, director, and former chairman of the National Youth Commission of the Philippines
1984 – Domenico Citro, Italian footballer
  1984   – Mary DeScenza, American swimmer
  1984   – John Kucera, Canadian skier
  1984   – Patrick van Luijk, Dutch sprinter
1985 – Tomáš Berdych, Czech tennis player
  1985   – Brendan Clarke, Irish footballer
  1985   – José Gonçalves, Portuguese footballer
  1985   – Brendan Oake, Australian rugby league player
  1985   – Alexander Ovechkin, Russian ice hockey player
  1985   – Mason Raymond, Canadian ice hockey player
1986 – Ravichandran Ashwin, Indian cricketer
  1986   – Paolo De Ceglie, Italian footballer
  1986   – Sophie, Scottish music producer, disc jockey and singer (d. 2021)
  1986   – Yussef Suleiman, Syrian footballer (d. 2013)
1987 – Paul Huntington, English footballer
1989 – Kate Deines, American soccer player
1990 – Sean Scannell, English footballer 
  1990   – Pixie Geldof, English model and singer 
1991 – Ryo Ishikawa, Japanese golfer
  1991   – Justyna Jegiołka, Polish tennis player
  1991   – Cameron King, Australian rugby league player
1993 – Sofiane Boufal, Moroccan footballer
  1993   – Sophie Howard, Scottish footballer
1994 – Na In-woo, South Korean actor
1995 – Patrick Mahomes, American football player
  1995   – Yoo Si-ah, South Korean singer
1996 – Esteban Ocon, French F1 racing driver
1997 – Auston Matthews, American ice hockey player
1999 – Jaimee Fourlis, Australian tennis player
2002 – Elina Avanesyan, Russian tennis player

Deaths

Pre-1600
 456 – Remistus, Roman general 
 936 – Unni, archbishop of Hamburg-Bremen
 958 – Li Jingsui, Chinese prince (b. 920)
1025 – Hugh Magnus, king of France (b. 1007)
1148 – Conan III, duke of Brittany (b. 1070)
1179 – Hildegard of Bingen, German abbess and polymath (b. 1098)
1322 – Robert III, count of Flanders (b. 1249)
1415 – Michael de la Pole, 2nd Earl of Suffolk (b. 1367)
1422 – Constantine II, tsar of Bulgaria
1482 – William III, duke of Luxembourg (b. 1425)
1563 – Henry Manners, 2nd Earl of Rutland, English soldier (b. 1526)
1574 – Pedro Menéndez de Avilés, Spanish admiral and explorer, founded St. Augustine, Florida (b. 1519)
1575 – Heinrich Bullinger, Swiss theologian and reformer (b. 1504)

1601–1900
1609 – Judah Loew ben Bezalel, Bohemian rabbi, mystic and philosopher (b. 1520)
1621 – Robert Bellarmine, Italian cardinal and saint (b. 1542)
1626 – Johann Schweikhard von Kronberg, German cleric and politician, Archbishop-Elector of Mainz (b. 1553)
1630 – Thomas Lake, English politician, English Secretary of State (b. 1567)
1637 – Katherine Clifton, 2nd Baroness Clifton, English-Scottish peer
1665 – Philip IV, king of Spain (b. 1605)
1676 – Sabbatai Zevi, Turkish rabbi and scholar (b. 1626)
1679 – John of Austria the Younger, Spanish general and politician, Governor of the Habsburg Netherlands (b. 1629)
1701 – Stanislaus Papczyński, Polish priest and saint (b. 1631)
1721 – Marguerite Louise d'Orléans, French princess (b. 1645)
1762 – Francesco Geminiani, Italian violinist and composer (b. 1687)
1771 – Tobias Smollett, Scottish-Italian author and poet (b. 1721)
1803 – Franz Xaver Süssmayr, Austrian composer and director (b. 1766)
1808 – Benjamin Bourne, American judge and politician (b. 1755)
1817 – Jacques Bernard d'Anselme, French general (b. 1740)
1836 – Antoine Laurent de Jussieu, French botanist and author (b. 1748)
1852 – Francisco Javier Echeverría, Mexican businessman and politician. President (1841) (b. 1797) 
1858 – Dred Scott, American slave (b. 1795)
1862 – Lawrence O'Bryan Branch, American politician and Confederate general (b. 1820)
  1862   – William E. Starke, Confederate general (b. 1814)
1863 – Charles Robert Cockerell, English archaeologist and architect (b. 1788)
  1863   – Alfred de Vigny, French author, poet, and playwright (b. 1797)
1864 – Walter Savage Landor, English author and poet (b. 1775)
1868 – Roman Nose, Native American warrior (b. circa 1823)
1877 – Henry Fox Talbot, English photographer, developed the Calotype Process (b. 1800)
1878 – Orélie-Antoine de Tounens, French lawyer and adventurer (b. 1825)
1879 – Eugène Viollet-le-Duc, French architect and theorist (b. 1814)
1892 – Rudolf von Jhering, German jurist (b. 1818)
1894 – Deng Shichang, Chinese captain (b. 1849)
1899 – Charles Alfred Pillsbury, American businessman, co-founded the Pillsbury Company (b. 1842)

1901–present
1907 – Ignaz Brüll, Czech-Austrian pianist and composer (b. 1846)
  1907   – Edmonia Lewis, American sculptor (b. 1844)
1908 – Henri Julien, Canadian cartoonist (b. 1852)
  1908   – Thomas Selfridge, American lieutenant and pilot (b. 1882)
1909 – Thomas Bent, Australian businessman and politician, 22nd Premier of Victoria (b. 1838)
1923 – Stefanos Dragoumis, Greek judge and politician, 92nd Prime Minister of Greece (b. 1842)
1925 – Carl Eytel, German-American painter and illustrator (b. 1862)
1933 – Joseph De Piro, Maltese priest and missionary (b. 1877)
1936 – Ettie Annie Rout, New Zealand author and activist (b. 1877)
1937 – Walter Dubislav, German logician and philosopher of science, Vienna circle member (b. 1895)
1938 – Bruno Jasieński, Polish poet and author (b. 1901)
1943 – Friedrich Zickwolff, German general (b. 1893)
1948 – Ruth Benedict, American anthropologist and academic (b. 1887)
  1948   – Folke Bernadotte, Swedish soldier and diplomat (b. 1895)
1951 – Jimmy Yancey, American pianist and composer (b. 1898) 
1953 – David Munson, American runner (b. 1884)
  1953   – Hans Feige, German general (Wehrmacht) (b. 1880)
1961 – Adnan Menderes, Turkish lawyer and politician, 9th Prime Minister of Turkey (b. 1899)
1965 – Alejandro Casona, Spanish poet and playwright (b. 1903)
1966 – Fritz Wunderlich, German tenor and actor (b. 1930)
1971 – Carlos Lamarca, Brazilian captain (b. 1937)
1972 – Akim Tamiroff, American actor (b. 1899)
1973 – Hugo Winterhalter, American bandleader and composer (b. 1909)
1975 – Nicola Moscona, Greek-American singer-songwriter (b. 1907)
1980 – Anastasio Somoza Debayle, Nicaraguan commander and politician, 73rd President of Nicaragua (b. 1925)
1982 – Manos Loïzos, Egyptian-Greek composer (b. 1937)
1983 – Humberto Sousa Medeiros, Portuguese-American cardinal (b. 1915)
1984 – Richard Basehart, American actor and director (b. 1914)
1985 – Laura Ashley, Welsh fashion designer, founded Laura Ashley plc (b. 1925) 
1987 – Harry Locke, English actor (b. 1913)
1991 – Zino Francescatti, French violinist and composer (b. 1902)
1992 – Roger Wagner, American conductor and educator (b. 1914)
1993 – Willie Mosconi, American pool player and actor (b. 1913)
  1993   – Christian Nyby, American director and producer (b. 1913)
1994 – John Delafose, American accordion player (b. 1939)
  1994   – Vitas Gerulaitis, American tennis player and coach (b. 1954)
  1994   – Karl Popper, Austrian-English philosopher and academic (b. 1902)
1995 – Isadore Epstein, Estonian-American astronomer and academic (b. 1919)
  1995   – Lucien Victor, Belgian cyclist (b. 1931)
1996 – Spiro Agnew, American soldier and politician, 39th Vice President of the United States (b. 1918)
1997 – Red Skelton, American actor and comedian (b. 1913)
1998 – Ted Binion, American poker player and businessman (b. 1943)
  1998   – Geoffrey Dutton, Australian historian and author (b. 1922)
1999 – Frankie Vaughan, English singer and actor (b. 1928)
2000 – Georgiy Gongadze, Georgian-Ukrainian journalist and director (b. 1969)
2003 – Erich Hallhuber, German actor (b. 1951)
2005 – Jacques Lacarrière, French journalist and critic (b. 1925)
  2005   – Alfred Reed, American composer and educator (b. 1921)
2009 – Dick Durock, American stuntman and actor (b. 1937)
  2009   – Noordin Mohammad Top, Malaysian terrorist (b. 1968)
2011 – Colin Madigan, Australian architect and author, designed the National Gallery of Australia (b. 1921)
2012 – Melvin Charney, Canadian sculptor and architect (b. 1935)
  2012   – Lou Kenton, English soldier and potter (b. 1908)
  2012   – Russell E. Train, American soldier and civil servant (b. 1920)
2013 – Kristian Gidlund, Swedish drummer and journalist  (b. 1983)
  2013   – Larry Lake, American-Canadian trumpet player and composer (b. 1943)
  2013   – Bernie McGann, Australian saxophonist and composer (b. 1937)
  2013   – Alex Naumik, Lithuanian-Norwegian singer-songwriter and producer (b. 1949)
  2013   – Michael J. Noonan, Irish farmer and politician, 25th Irish Minister of Defence (b. 1935)
  2013   – Marvin Rainwater, American singer-songwriter (b. 1925)
  2013   – Eiji Toyoda, Japanese businessman (b. 1913)
2014 – George Hamilton IV, American singer-songwriter and guitarist (b. 1937)
  2014   – Andriy Husin, Ukrainian footballer and manager (b. 1972)
  2014   – Wakachichibu Komei, Japanese sumo wrestler (b. 1939)
  2014   – Charles Read, Australian air marshal (b. 1918)
  2014   – Peter von Bagh, Finnish historian, director, and screenwriter (b. 1943)
  2014   – China Zorrilla, Uruguayan actress (b. 1922)
2015 – Ingrīda Andriņa, Latvian actress (b. 1944)
  2015   – Dettmar Cramer, German footballer and manager (b. 1925)
  2015   – Milo Hamilton, American sportscaster (b. 1927)
  2015   – Vadim Kuzmin, Russian physicist and academic (b. 1937)
  2015   – David Willcocks, English organist, composer, and conductor (b. 1919)
2016 – Bahman Golbarnezhad, Iranian racing cyclist (b. 1968)
  2016   – Sigge Parling, Swedish footballer (b. 1936)
2017 – Bobby Heenan, American professional wrestling manager (b. 1944)
2019 – Cokie Roberts, American journalist and bestselling author (b. 1943)
2020 – Robert W. Gore, American engineer and businessman, co-inventor of Gore-Tex (b. 1937)
2021 – Abdelaziz Bouteflika, Algerian politician, President of Algeria (b. 1937)
2022 – Maarten Schmidt, Dutch astronomer (b. 1929)

Holidays and observances
Australian Citizenship Day
Christian feast day:
Albert of Vercelli
Ariadne of Phrygia
Blessed Cecilia Eusepi
Stanislaus Papczyński
Hildegard of Bingen 
Lambert
Robert Bellarmine
Satyrus of Milan
Socrates and Stephen
Zygmunt Szczęsny Feliński
September 17 (Eastern Orthodox liturgics)
Constitution Day, observed on the previous Friday if it falls on a Saturday, the following Monday if on a Sunday; and the beginning of the Constitution Week (United States)
Heroes' Day (Angola)
Marathwada Liberation Day (Maharashtra)
National Unity Day (Belarus) (since 2021)
Operation Market Garden Anniversary is still remembered with parachuting and dedications on this day. (Netherlands)
Teachers' Day (Honduras)

References

External links

 
 
 

Days of the year
September